Humiliation is the abasement of pride, which creates mortification or leads to a state of being humbled or reduced to lowliness or submission. It is an emotion felt by a person whose social status, either by force or willingly, has just decreased. It can be brought about through intimidation, physical or mental mistreatment or trickery, or by embarrassment if a person is revealed to have committed a socially or legally unacceptable act. Whereas humility can be sought alone as a means to de-emphasize the ego, humiliation must involve other person(s), though not necessarily directly or willingly.

Humiliation is currently an active research topic, and is now seen as an important – and complex – core dynamic in human relationships, having implications at intrapersonal, interpersonal, institutional and international levels.

Psychological effects 
A person who suffers from severe humiliation could experience major depressions, suicidal states, and severe anxiety states such as post-traumatic stress disorder. The loss of status, like losing a job or being labeled as a liar or discredited unfairly, could cause people inability to behave normally in their communities. Humiliated individuals could be provoked and crave for revenge, and some people could feel worthless, hopeless and helpless, creating suicidal thoughts if justice is not met. It also can lead to new insights, activism and a new kinship with marginalized groups.

Feelings of humiliation can produce 'humiliated fury', which when turned inward can result in apathy and depression, and when turned outward can give rise to paranoia, sadistic behaviour and fantasies of revenge. Klein explains, "When it is outwardly directed, humiliated fury unfortunately creates additional victims, often including innocent bystanders. When it is inwardly directed, the resulting self-hate renders victims incapable of meeting their own needs, let alone having energy available to love and care for others." He goes on to say, "In either case, those who are consumed by humiliated fury are absorbed in themselves or their cause, wrapped in wounded pride..."

A study by researchers at the University of Michigan revealed that "the same regions of the brain that become active in response to painful sensory experiences are activated during intense experiences of social rejection." In other words, humiliation and loneliness are experienced as intensely as physical pain.

Punishments and interrogation tactics 

Humiliating of one person by another (the humiliator) is often used as a way of asserting power over them, and is a common form of oppression or abuse used in a police, military, or prison context during legal interrogations or illegal torture sessions. Many now-obsolete public punishments were deliberately designed to be humiliating, e.g. tarring and feathering lawbreakers, pillory, "mark of shame" (stigma) as a means of "making an example" of a person and presenting a deterrent to others. Some practices, such as tarring and feathering, became tools of unofficial mob justice. In folk customs such as the English skimmington rides and rough music (and their continental equivalents, such as the French Charivari), dramatic public demonstrations of moral disapproval were enacted to humiliate transgressors and drive them out of the community.

Some U.S. states have experimented with humiliating or shaming lawbreakers by publishing their names and indicating their offense (e.g., with soliciting prostitutes or drinking and driving). In 2010, there was public outcry about reports showing police in Dongguan and Guangdong in China leading a parade of arrested prostitutes for the purpose of humiliating them. The national Ministry of Public Security reprimanded the local police and affirmed that such punishments are not allowed.

A wider human perspective 

Donald Klein described humiliation as "a powerful factor in human affairs that has, for a variety of reasons, been overlooked by students of individual and collective behavior. It is a pervasive and all too destructive influence in the behavior of individuals, groups, organizations, and nations."

Though it is a subjective emotion, humiliation has a universal aspect which applies to all human beings: "it is the feeling of being put down, made to feel less than one feels oneself to be."

A society that suffers from humiliation is an unstable one.  The cognitive dissonance between the way in which the society is perceived and the way in which it sees itself can be so great that violence can result on a massive scale against people belonging to an out group.  According to Jonathan Sacks, "By turning the question 'What did we do wrong?' into 'Who did this to us?', [hate against an out group] restores some measure of self-respect and provides a course of action.  In psychiatry, the clinical terms for this process are splitting and projection; it allows people to define themselves as victims."

See also

References

Further reading 
 
 
 
 Henryson, Dean (2014). ″Girl Fighting Exposed.″ Createspace. .

External links 

Human Dignity and Humiliation Studies
Emotional Competency article on Humiliation
Silvan Tomkins Site Resources on Shame and Humiliation Studies
German football team humiliate Brazil 7-1 during World Cup
Femenia, Nora. Healing Humiliation and the Need for Revenge

Pain
Morality
Emotions
Sexual acts
Bullying
Abuse
Psychological abuse
Domestic violence
Sexual fetishism
Terrorism tactics